Angel (released as Danny Boy in the United States) is a 1982 Irish film written and directed by Neil Jordan and starring Stephen Rea. The film was Neil Jordan's directorial debut, and the executive producer was John Boorman.

Premise
Danny, a saxophonist with a travelling band, witnesses the gangland murder of the band's manager (involved in extortion payoffs) and that of a deaf and mute girl witness at a dancehall in South Armagh. Danny tries to hunt down the murderers and in doing so his relationship with Deirdre, the singer in his band, falls apart and he becomes a murderer himself.

Cast
 Stephen Rea as Danny
 Veronica Quilligan as Annie
 Honor Heffernan as Deirdre
 Alan Devlin as Bill
 Peter Caffrey as Ray
 Gerard McSorley as Assistant
 Ray McAnally as Bloom
 Anthony Tyler Quin as Tony Quinn

Production
The film is set in Northern Ireland and it is implied that the extortionists/murderers are loyalist paramilitaries (one is described as "a Prod" by his Catholic girlfriend; another is a policeman). However, there is little specific reference to the Northern Ireland Troubles.

The film was made in and around inner-city Dublin (standing in for Belfast) and Jordan's native Bray. In the sequences where the band play in a seaside resort (probably supposed to be Portstewart, since Danny is shown asking older bandsmen about their memories of his late uncle, whom we are earlier told played in a band at Portstewart) Bray Head is visible in some background shots. Other locations include the former Butlin's holiday camp in Mosney, County Meath, and the former St. Brendans Hospital, Grangegorman.

The dance and crowd scenes from the Mosney ballroom had to be re-shot due to a problem with the film processing.

References

External links
 

1982 films
1982 drama films
1980s English-language films
English-language Irish films
Irish drama films
Films shot in the Republic of Ireland
Films directed by Neil Jordan
1982 directorial debut films